Vitanovo is a nature reserve in the Strandzha mountains of south-eastern Bulgaria. Vitanovo is one of the five reserves situated in Strandzha Nature Park. It lies in south-eastern Bulgaria near the border with Turkey. The reserve encompasses an area of 1112.4 ha or 11.124 km2. The reserve can only be accessed with a special permission, issued by the Ministry of Environment and Water of Bulgaria, for conducting research or for specialized tourism under strict rules and routes.

The nearest village is Brashlyan in the Municipality of Malko Tarnovo.

Within the territory of the reserve there are 462 species of plants: 421 herbaceous, 26 relict and 9 Balkan endemic species. The reserve is characterized by forests of Fagus orientalis, Carpinus betulus, Quercus frainetto, Quercus cerris and different species of oak.

Among the natural landmarks in Vitanovo are karst springs and caves, the most studied of which is the Bratanova Cave.

References

External links 
 
 
 

Nature reserves in Bulgaria
Strandzha
Geography of Burgas Province
Tourist attractions in Burgas Province
Protected areas established in 1981
1981 establishments in Bulgaria